Adam Kuban (born 1974 in Milwaukee, Wisconsin) was the editor and founding publisher of Slice NY, a weblog devoted to the subject of pizza. He was "one of the early single-subject food bloggers", according to Bloomberg. Raised in the suburbs of Kansas City, Kuban's father opened his own pizzeria in Kansas in the early 1980s but only lasted for a year and a half after Pizza Hut opened across the street. Kuban pursued a career in journalism, beginning as a copy editor for his college newspaper, the University Daily Kansan at the University of Kansas. He is also the founding publisher and current editor of A Hamburger Today, a similar weblog that reviews and analyzes trends in the hamburger world. In October 2006, Kuban sold Slice and A Hamburger Today to Serious Eats, a start-up food site founded by food writer Ed Levine that is focused on sharing food enthusiasm through blogs and online community. Kuban now serves as editor emeritus of Serious Eats.

After years into blogging Kuban quit and started making pizzas. He erected a pop-up called Margot's located at Emily in Brooklyn's Clinton Hill.

References

A Hamburger Today
Slice
Serious Eats
Adam Kuban's Vox
Adam Kuban, Pizza Enthusiast
For the Pizza Loving Republican-GOPizza
A Hamburger Today Media clippings.
Slice Press archives.
Blogging Pizza

1974 births
Living people
Writers from Milwaukee
American bloggers